Hello Sister is a 1930 American Pre-Code drama film directed by Walter Lang.

Cast
 Olive Borden as Vee Newell
 Lloyd Hughes as Marshall Jones
 George Fawcett as Fraser Newell
 Bodil Rosing as Martha Peddie
 Norman Peck as 'Tivvie' Rose
 Howard C. Hickman as John Stanley (as Howard Hickman)
 Raymond Keane as Randall Carr
 Wilfred Lucas as Dr. Saltus

References

External links
 

1930 films
1930 drama films
American drama films
1930s English-language films
American black-and-white films
Films directed by Walter Lang
1930s American films